Justinhaugh railway station served the hamlet of Justinhaugh, Angus, Scotland, from 1895 to 1952 on the Forfar and Brechin Railway.

History 
The station was opened on 1 June 1895 by the Caledonian Railway, although a pre-opening reference from 25 October 1894 erroneous called it Oathlaw. On the westbound platform was the station building, to the west was the goods yard and on the west side of the eastbound platform was the signal box. Inside the yard was the station cottage. The station closed on 4 August 1952.

References 

Disused railway stations in Angus, Scotland
Former Caledonian Railway stations
Railway stations in Great Britain opened in 1895
Railway stations in Great Britain closed in 1952
1895 establishments in Scotland
1952 disestablishments in Scotland